Alan (sometimes Alan II of Brittany or Alan III of Nantes) (born after 981, died 990) was the only known son of Guerech, Duke of Brittany, and Aremberg. With his mother he founded the castle of Ancenis around 987, according to the Chronicle of Nantes. In 988, he succeeded his father as Count of Nantes and perhaps nominal Duke of Brittany, after his father was murdered by Count Conan I of Rennes. The following two years were marked by endless warfare between Rennes and Nantes. In 990, Alan died, either of an illness or else killed by Conan, who took Nantes and had himself proclaimed Duke of Brittany by the bishop of Nantes, Orscand de Vannes.

References

Bibliography 

 Bernard S. Bachrach. Fulk Nerra, the Neo-Roman Consul, 987–1040. University of California Press, 1993.
 André Chédeville and Noël-Yves Tonnerre. La Bretagne féodale XIe-XIIIe siècle. Ouest-France Université Rennes (1987) .
 Michael Jones. Creation of Brittany: A Late Medieval State. The Hambledon Press, 1988.
 Noël-Yves Tonnerre. Naissance de la Bretagne. Géographie historique et structures sociales de la Bretagne méridionale (Nantais et Vannetais) de la fin du VIIIe à la fin du XIIe siècle. Presses de l'Université d'Angers Angers (1994) .

External links

 René Merlet, ed. La chronique de Nantes (570 environ – 1049). Alphonse Picard, 1896.

980s births
990 deaths
10th-century dukes of Brittany
Year of birth uncertain
Dukes of Brittany
Counts of Nantes